Gregor Samsa is the protagonist of Franz Kafka's novella The Metamorphosis.

Gregor Samsa may also refer to:
 Gregor Samsa (band), an American post-rock band
Gregor Samsa (EP), the band's 2002 debut EP
"Gregor Samsa", a 2015 song by Momus from Glyptothek